Ilya Petrovich Kopalin (1900–1976) was a Soviet film director remembered for his documentaries. His most famous footage is that of Stalin, Churchill and Roosevelt at the Yalta Conference and that of Yuri Gagarin's space flight.

Life
He was born the son of a peasant on 2 August 1900 in the village of Pavlovskaya, Zvenigorod on the outskirts of Moscow. In his youth he worked in a factory in Moscow. After October 1917 he trained first as a land surveyor then as a pilot. A chance meeting with Dziga Vertov led him instantly into an interest in the cinema. Aged 24 he went to work for Vertov as a camera-man, working on films such as Kinoglaz,  but later would work independently. His early films look at country life and agriculture in the newly created USSR.

His work gained him six Stalin Prizes and the Order of Lenin. He died in Moscow on 12 June 1976.

Filmography
Moscow (1927)
For the Harvest  (1929)
Fifteen Years of Soviet Cinematography (1933)
Engineers of the Human Soul (1934) – a documentary recording the First Congress of Soviet Writers
Abyssinia (1935)
China's Rebuff (1937)
Ma Dunae (On the Danube) (1940) – Stalin Prize 1941
Rout of the German Troops at Moscow (1941)
Stalin's Speech of November 6, 1942 (1943)
Moscow Strikes Back (1942) – Academy Award for Best Documentary Feature
 Crimea Conference  (1945)
Liberated Czechoslovakia (1945)
Victory Day Country   (1948)
 New Albania  (1949)
Man Conquers Nature (1950)
Albania   (1953)
Great Farewell   (1953)
For Peace and Friendship   (1954)
Songs over the Vistula (1955)
Festival Melody (1955)
Warsaw Meeting   (1956)
Lulz Shippers   (1959)
 Destiny of a Great City   (1961)
First Flight to the Stars   (1961) – a chronicle of Yuri Gargarin's space flight
Tocsin of Peace (1963)
Qunetra Ruins Accused (1974)

References

External links

   – Duration: 1:06:21

1900 births
1976 deaths
People from Istrinsky District
People from Zvenigorodsky Uyezd (Moscow Governorate)
Communist Party of the Soviet Union members 
Soviet cinematographers
Soviet film directors
Soviet film editors
Soviet documentary film directors
People's Artists of the USSR
People's Artists of the RSFSR
Stalin Prize winners
Recipients of the Order of Lenin
Grand Crosses of the Order of the White Lion
Burials at Kuntsevo Cemetery